Ricanula stigmatica is a small and common fulgoroidea planthopper from the family Ricaniidae. It is moth-like in appearance, with green and brown coloration. 
This species can be found in Southeast Asia.

References

Ricaniidae